"Sundown Syndrome" is a song by Tame Impala, released as a single in 2009. It was the band's first official single release. Its B-side was a cover of the Blue Boy song "Remember Me". The title "Sundown Syndrome" refers to a psychological phenomenon called sundowning.

Composition
"Sundown Syndrome" was written by Kevin Parker in the key of E major in a mostly 6/8 time signature. It is based around the repeating chords of Fm7 and Gm7.

The song begins in 4/4 with the two above mentioned chords, while the drums are loose and jazzy and have flange added to them. It then changes to 6/8 time with a looser strumming pattern.

The verse comes soon after, with basic strums of the chords and occasional fills played on electric guitar. A kazoo then comes in, which some people mistook for a fuzz guitar, to play a solo in the E major scale over the same Fm7, Gm7 chord progression.

Another verse featuring the same previous structure, and another kazoo solo in the same E major scale return again. This gives way to a chorus using the barre chord progression of D flat major, G flat major, E major, B major, G flat major and D flat major. The chorus is in 6/8 time, but switches to one bar of 4/4 at the end of every chord progression, and four bars of 4/4 at the end of every chorus. Parker's vocals are heavily reverbed and delayed to give it a spacy atmosphere.

A bridge in 6/8 time comes next, with simple strums of the chords Fm7, Gm7, Fm7, A major and E major. A heavily phased, jazzy guitar solo using the E major scale comes in over the Fm7, Gm7 chord progression.

The chorus comes back, and then a variation of the chorus barre chord progression on a phased guitar is played by itself, this time with just D flat major, G flat major and E major with occasional glissando slides between the chords. After a few bars of the guitar on its own, the chorus vocals come back over the top with occasional quiet bass fills. The chorus then comes back to its original form with the full band, and is extended longer than before.

The song ends the way it started, in 4/4 with the strumming of the Fm7 and Gm7 chords. A barred C major chord with guitar feedback completely ends the song.

Recording
Both "Sundown Syndrome" and "Remember Me" were recorded at Toe Rag Studios in London, UK with Liam Watson in March 2009. Parker later recalled "There was no-one really doing any producing, we just played [Sundown Syndrome] how it was destined to be played and then Liam recorded it and just did his thing. We just wanted to do the Toerag thing basically and it was a really awesome experience, the sound he gets at Toerag are amazing its like no other studio in the world both visually and sonically."

Release
"Sundown Syndrome" was later featured on the soundtrack for 2010 film The Kids Are All Right and was also included on the Ministry of Sound compilation album Chillout Sessions XII. "Sundown Syndrome" and "Remember Me" were later re-released on the deluxe edition of Innerspeaker. "Remember Me" came in at number 78 in the Triple J Hottest 100 in 2009.

Live performances
"Sundown Syndrome" was added to Tame Impala's set in 2009, and was played right through 2010. In 2011, it wasn't performed as regularly. It was performed for the first time in several years at the Panorama festival in 2017.  A performance of "Sundown Syndrome" was filmed for the 2009 Summer Sonic Festival, and a live version was later released on their live album Live at the Corner.

"Remember Me" has been performed as far back as 2008, and is still occasionally played, as of 2011. It was added to their set with the addition of Jay Watson on drums, because the song fit his drumming style. In 2010, Tame Impala incorporated a quiet outro where Parker loops his vocals and experiments with effects while Dominic Simper plays synth chords. Parker was an instant fan of the song when he saw a music video for it on Australian music television program Rage at the age of 11.

Track listing
 "Sundown Syndrome" – 5:50
 "Remember Me" – 4:22
 "Sundown Syndrome (Canyons Remix)" – 7:47 (Digital release only track)

Personnel
Kevin Parker – all vocals and instrumentation

References

External links

2009 songs
2009 debut singles
Tame Impala songs
Song recordings produced by Kevin Parker
Songs written by Kevin Parker (musician)